Michael Edward Gash (born 3 September 1986) is an English footballer who is player manager for National league North side Peterborough Sports, where he plays as a striker.

Gash's nomadic career has seen him play primarily in the Football Conference, though he finally made the step up to the Football League with Barnet in 2015.

Club career
Gash was born in Rinteln, Germany as his father was stationed there as a head teacher in the British Army. Gash began his career in the youth system of Cambridge City, making his first-team debut on 7 October 2003 when starting and scoring in a 12–0 home win over Waterbeach in the Cambridgeshire Invitation Cup. Upon establishing himself in the first team, a one-in-three strike rate in the 2005–06 season saw him join city rivals Cambridge United for 2006–07.

In September 2006, Gash was loaned back to the Lilywhites, having failed to hold down a first-team spot. After one season with the U's, in which he scored only two goals, Gash re-joined City on a permanent basis in July 2007. The 2007–08 season saw Gash flourish in the Conference South, scoring 27 goals in all competitions. City's demotion to the Southern League hastened his departure from the Lilywhites, and he was sold to Ebbsfleet United in August 2008 in a deal worth £20k plus a sell-on fee.

Gash's second crack at the top division of non-league football was more successful, as he scored 11 times across the course of the season, which again saw him attract transfer interest. In July 2009, MyFootballClub members voted (94.2% for, 5.8% against) to sell Gash to an unnamed bidder in a deal worth £55,000, this bidder later turned out to be York City. The deal also included a 20% sell-on, 30% of which would go to Cambridge City, who received £7,000 from the sale to the Minstermen.

Gash's spell in Yorkshire proved to be disappointing, with only 8 goals in 63 games in all competitions, though he was called up to the England C squad in September 2010. He was loaned to Rushden & Diamonds in December 2010, where he was far more successful, scoring six times in 19 games. In June 2011, Gash re-joined Cambridge United on a free transfer. After an unspectacular 2011–12 season, in which he scored 7 goals in 42 games, Gash was loaned to Braintree Town in August 2012. Following his return from loan, Gash was far more prolific, scoring 15 times in 30 games, which attracted interest from other clubs in the league – a bid from an unnamed club was rejected in January 2013. He joined Kidderminster Harriers on loan in March 2013 for the rest of the season. Director of football Jez George said, immediately following the loan agreement, that loaning out Gash was the best scenario financially for the U's, with Gash's salary demands scuppering chances of agreeing a new contract at the Abbey Stadium. Gash joined the Harriers permanently at the end of the season on a two-year deal after scoring six times in 11 games for Kiddy – taking his league tally for the season to 21 overall, making him the joint-second top scorer in the division. He scored 22 goals in 72 games for the U's.

Gash scored 15 goals in 42 games during his first full season as a Kidderminster player, including two goals in a 4–2 win over Newport County in the FA Cup second round, which earned him the Player of the Round award from The Football Association, as well the opener in their away upset win over Peterborough United in round three. The following season, Gash scored only three goals in 17 games between August and November and was loaned out to Nuneaton Town with Harriers needing to reduce their wage bill. He scored only once in 11 games for the Boro, and following the expiry of his loan, left Kidderminster by mutual consent in January 2015.

Six days later, Gash joined Barnet, despite manager Martin Allen stating that "He has got an attitude, there is no doubt about it, and I do not think it is always a good one... I told him straight exactly what his position would be – it would be sub." Less than a month later, following his performance in a home win over Woking, Allen then said that "He is a better player than I thought, to be honest. I always thought he was half decent but in training the last couple of weeks he has lost a lot of weight and improved his level of fitness. He is a tremendous character around the group and he is a good player."

Gash signed a new one-year deal at Barnet for the 2015–16 season. He made his Football League debut against Leyton Orient on 8 August 2015. Following four goals in five games in September, Gash was named League Two Player of the Month. In August 2016, Gash injured his cruciate ligament, putting him out for the rest of the season, and he was released following the expiry of his contract.

In an effort to get his career back on track, he signed for King's Lynn Town of the seventh tier of the English football pyramid in July 2017. After 14 goals in his first season, in which the Linnets lost the Southern Football League play-off final to Slough Town, Gash scored nine league goals in his second season and followed this up with a goal in the Southern League Premier Central play-off final win against Alvechurch, and then scored the winner in extra time in the super play-off against Warrington Town to secure promotion to the National League North. After four seasons at the club that included back-to-back promotions as King's Lynn reached the fifth tier of English football for the first time, Gash departed the club at the end of the 2020–21 season, citing his full time job as a tree-surgeon as the reason for not wanting to continue his time with the club. In his last match for the club he scored in a dramatic 4–4 draw with Aldershot Town.

Gash signed for Southern League Premier Division Central side Peterborough Sports on 8 June 2021.

International career
Gash was capped once by the England national C team, in a 2–2 away draw with Wales on 5 September 2010.

Career statistics

Honours
Barnet
Conference Premier: 2014–15

References

External links

Michael Gash profile at the official Barnet F.C. website

Profile at UpThePosh!

1986 births
Living people
People from Rinteln
Footballers from Lower Saxony
English footballers
Association football forwards
Cambridge City F.C. players
Cambridge United F.C. players
Ebbsfleet United F.C. players
York City F.C. players
Rushden & Diamonds F.C. players
Braintree Town F.C. players
Kidderminster Harriers F.C. players
Nuneaton Borough F.C. players
Barnet F.C. players
King's Lynn Town F.C. players
Peterborough Sports F.C. players
Eastern Counties Football League players
National League (English football) players
English Football League players
Southern Football League players
England semi-pro international footballers
English football managers
Peterborough Sports F.C. managers